The following is a comprehensive discography of They Might Be Giants, an American alternative rock band comprising several artists including John Flansburgh, John Linnell, Marty Beller, Dan Miller, and Danny Weinkauf. The band's first release was the November 4, 1986 eponymously titled They Might Be Giants, but TMBG did not gain commercial success until their March 1990 single "Birdhouse in Your Soul" from the album Flood. "Birdhouse in Your Soul" reached #3 on the United States Modern Rock Tracks chart and #6 on the UK Singles Chart and remains their highest-charting single in both countries. Over the next two decades, They Might Be Giants released studio albums on a near-biennial fashion and currently have a total of 23 studio albums along with 11 live albums, 12 compilation albums, 15 extended plays and 30 singles.

Albums

Studio albums

Live albums

Compilation albums

EPs

Singles

Contributions and other releases 
 "Particle Man" & "Istanbul (Not Constantinople)" for Tiny Toons in the MTV spoof episode
 "One More Parade" for Rubaiyat: Elektra's 40th Anniversary Tribute CD (1990)
 "SenSurround" for Mighty Morphin Power Rangers: The Movie Soundtrack (1995)
 "25 O' Clock" for Testimonial Dinner: The Songs of XTC Tribute CD (1995)
 "Spiraling Shape" for Kids in the Hall: Brain Candy Soundtrack (1996)
 "Dr. Evil" for Austin Powers: The Spy Who Shagged Me Soundtrack (1999)
 "Boss of Me" and "Older" for Music from Malcolm in the Middle (2000)
 "Puppy Love" for Blue's Clues Commercial (2000)
 "I've Got A Fang" (Demo) for This Is Next Year: A Brooklyn-Based Compilation (2001)
 CD soundtrack to McSweeney's Quarterly, issue 6 (2001) (Contributions, and arrangement of music by others)
"Courage the Cowardly Dog" for Cartoon Network promo (2001)
 "Darlin' Allison" for Gordon Gano's Hitting the Ground album (2002)
 "So to Be One of Us" for Return to Never Land Soundtrack (2002)
 "Now That You're One of Us" for Return to Never Land Soundtrack (2002)
 "The Long Grift" for Wig in a Box (2003)
 "Savoy Truffle" for Songs from the Material World (2003)
 "Baroque Hoedown" for DisneyMania 2 (2004) and Moog Soundtrack (2004)
 "Tippecanoe and Tyler Too" for Future Soundtrack for America (2004)
 "Ana Ng" for Left of the Dial: Dispatches from the '80s Underground Compilation (2004)
 "Through Being Cool" for Sky High Soundtrack (2005)
"Mickey Mouse Clubhouse Theme Song" for Mickey Mouse Clubhouse Soundtrack (2006)
 "Hot Dog!" for Mickey Mouse Clubhouse Soundtrack (2006)
 "Happy Doesn't Have to Have an Ending" for Happily N'Ever After Soundtrack (2007)
 "There's a Great Big Beautiful Tomorrow" a song for the Meet the Robinsons soundtrack (2007)
 "Havalina" (Pixies cover) for "Dig For Fire - a tribute to PIXIES" (2007)
 "Other Father's Song" for the film "Coraline" (2009)
 "Choo Choo Express" for the Mickey Mouse Clubhouse DVD Choo Choo Express (2008)
 "200 sbemails" for Strong Bad Emails Homestar Runner Email Thunder episode (2008)
 "I'm Not a Loser" for SpongeBob SquarePants: The Broadway Musical (2016)
 "3rd Amendment" for 27: The Most Perfect Album (2018)
 "Pour Poor Me More Please" for Central Park (TV series) (2021)

Videography

Music videos
The band has released 25 main music videos for songs from their rock albums. All of their children's albums have also included video content or run alongside DVD releases. The band also has videos for each of the Dial-A-Song tracks from 2015 and 2018 on their main YouTube channel, ParticleMen.

Direct from Brooklyn
In 1999, They Might Be Giants released Direct from Brooklyn, a VHS compilation of their music videos from 1986 up to that point. It was reissued on DVD in 2003. The following music videos were included:
 "Put Your Hand Inside the Puppet Head" (1986)
 "Don't Let's Start" (1986)
 "(She Was a) Hotel Detective" (1986)
 "Ana Ng" (1988)
 "Purple Toupee" (1988)
 "They'll Need a Crane" (1988)
 "Birdhouse in Your Soul" (1990)
 "Istanbul" (animated) (1990)
 "The Statue Got Me High" (1992)
 "The Guitar (The Lion Sleeps Tonight)" (1992)
 "Snail Shell" (1994)
 "Doctor Worm" (1998)

Other videos
 "Rabid Child" (unreleased, filmed in 1986)
 "Boss of Me" (2001)
 "Experimental Film" (animated) (2004)
 "Bastard Wants to Hit Me" (animated) (2004)
 "Here in Higglytown" (animated) (2004)
 "With The Dark" (animated) (2007)
 "The Shadow Government" (animated) (2007)
 "I'm Impressed" (animated) (2007)
 "The Mesopotamians" (animated) (2007)
 "Can't Keep Johnny Down" (2011)
 "Cloisonné" (2011)
 "In Fact" (2011)
 "You Probably Get That a Lot" (2011)
 "Spoiler Alert" (2011)
 "Marty Beller Mask" (2011)
 "When Will You Die" (2012)
 "Icky" (animated) (2013)
 "Nanobots" (animated) (2013)
 "Insect Hospital" (animated) (2013)
 "Black Ops" (2013)
 "You're on Fire" (2013)
 "Am I Awake?" (2014)

Notes

References

Discography
Discographies of American artists
Pop music group discographies
They Might Be Giants